Citizens, formerly known as Citizens & Saints, are an American Christian rock band from Seattle, Washington.

Background
Citizens & Saints were formerly based at Mars Hill Church, which was one of their record labels. Zach Bolen leads the band. Bolen resigned from Mars Hill in 2014, where he served as elder and worship leader.

Their album, Citizens, has seen critical and commercial success since its 2013 release.

After changing their name, the band released their second studio album, Join the Triumph, in November 2014. This album incorporated more electronic sounds and synthesizers can be heard on several of the tracks. The album is still in keeping with their fundamental indie/alternative rock sound.

Music
The band released an EP called Already / Not Yet on May 8, 2012, which was done only on the Mars Hill label.

Their first full-length studio album under the band name Citizens & Saints was Citizens, released on March 12, 2013. This album was released on both the BEC Recordings and Mars Hill Records labels, and was produced by Brian Eichelberger.

Their second full-length studio album, Join the Triumph, was released on November 11, 2014, by BEC Recordings and was again produced by Eichelberger.

A third album, titled A Mirror Dimly, was released on September 16, 2016.

Discography

Album

EP

References

BEC Recordings artists
Christian rock groups from Washington (state)
Musical groups established in 2011
2011 establishments in Washington (state)